Din–The Day is a 2022 Bangladeshi–Iranian joint produced action film directed by Morteza Atashzamzam and produced by Ananta Jalil under his production banner Monsoon Films. The film features Ananta Jalil and Afiea Nusrat Barsha in lead roles.

Synopsis
A Swat agent sent for a mission to destroy an international drug chain and terrorists.

Cast
 Ananta Jalil as AJ The SWAT officer
 Barsha 
 Sumon Farukh
 Misha Sawdagor as a Police commissioner
 Adem Arslan
 Saner Pakoglu

Production
In 2018, a production team from Iran made a documentary film about Rohingya genocide titled Buddha's Shame, directed by Morteza Atashzamzam. After watching Ananta's films, the Iranian ambassador to Bangladesh submitted a report about him to the Iranian government. He then put the production team in touch with Ananta Jalil. Then Jalil was invited to Iran by the Iranian government. On June 18, 2018, Ananta met with Alireza Tabesh of the Farabi Cinema Foundation to discuss the concept of the film. Ananta Jalil said he wanted to make a film that would highlight the real Islam. Alireza Tabesh then said that he was willing to produce the film but that the script of the film should be satisfactory to them.

In October 18 of the same year, a film related agreement was signed. It is known that Morteza Atashzamzam jointly produced the film with Monsoon Film. The shooting of the film started on 27 February 2019. Ananta Jalil was injured while shooting in Herat, in March, and the shooting was postponed for at least two weeks. Its shooting was postponed again in July 2020 due to the COVID-19 epidemic. Four months later, the shooting resumed on October 30. The shooting ended on 18 November. The film was shot on 8K camera. The production team used Dolby Atmos 7.1 surround sound technology. It has been shot in Bangladesh, Iran, Turkey and Morocco.

Marketing
The first trailer of the film was released on YouTube on March 15, 2020. The songs of the film were released on YouTube on March 4, 2022. The final official trailer of the film was uploaded on YouTube on June 21, 2022. Then, as part of marketing, Ananta Jalil and Barsha went to Teacher-Student Centre, University of Dhaka on June 24 to show another trailer to students.

Music

Controversies
In August, Morteza Atashzamzam accused Ananta Jalil of violating the terms and conditions of the film. Ananta Jalil made the film in his own way without discussing with the director. As a result, the film has turned into a low-quality film, the director said. Morteza also requested Ananta to drop the names of Iranians from the list of names of the film's production team due to non-compliance with the terms of the contract, but Ananta refused the request. Morteza filed a case against Ananta in a court in Tehran, and said he would file a case in Bangladesh as well. Ananta rejected the director's statement. He termed his allegation as part of a conspiracy against him.

Ananta Jalil claimed that it was produced on an estimated budget of ৳100 crore, that makes it the most expensive Bangladeshi film at the time of its release. But later Morteza Atashzamzam, co-producer of the flim, published the film related agreement via Instagram which states that it's actual budget was ৳4 core. As per the contract, Ananta was supposed to pay the entire budget, but he paid only 4.8 percent of the total amount. After the release of the director's contract, when Entertainment reporter of Prothom Alo asked Ananta about this, he claimed that the contract was edited, but he refrained from giving any direct answer regarding the film's budget.

Release
The film was initially slated for release in December 2019. Later, the owner of Monsoon Films had planned to release the film on Eid-ul-Azha in 2021. It is scheduled to be released in 80 countries. The release date of the film was later fixed for December 24, 2021, but it was postponed due to COVID-19 pandemic. On 5 June 2022, the film got censor certificate in Bangladesh. Din: The Day was announced to be released on Eid-ul-Azha 2022.

Reception
The film mostly received negative reviews from audience. Actress Barsha said “Din: The Day' might be our last film” due to so much criticism and trolls over on social media.
Columnist Ahsan Kabir of Bdnews24.com referred to the film as "a big budget trolled movie". He criticized Jalil and Barsha's poor acting and the story of the film as well as Ananta's wrongly spelled dialogue delivery in English. Called the film as "One of the greatest comedies of all time in Bengali Cinema", Jawad Saif from The Business Standard criticised it in his film review and referred to it a film with an unseen story. Columnist Asrar Chowdhury of The Daily Star thinks that the film was made like James Bond films but families can enjoy it unlike that film. Journalist Munni Saha praised the film in her article and compared its filmmaking with films of Tamil cinema. Misha Sawdagor, who plays the police commissioner in the film, said about the film that it did not contribute to the cinema of Bangladesh because the performers here are not professionals but amateurs.

References

External links
 

2022 films
2022 multilingual films
Bengali-language Bangladeshi films
English-language Bangladeshi films
2020s Bengali-language films
2020s Persian-language films
2020s English-language films
Bangladeshi action films
Bangladeshi thriller films
Iranian action films
Bangladeshi multilingual films
Iranian multilingual films
Films shot in Bangladesh
Films shot in Iran
Films shot in Turkey
Films shot in Morocco
Films shot in Lebanon
Monsoon Films films
Film controversies in Bangladesh
Films postponed due to the COVID-19 pandemic